Soragna is a town and comune in the province of Parma of northern Italy with a population of about 4,800.

The town is known from 712, when it was mentioned in a document by the Lombard king Liutprand. From 1198 it was a possession of the Lupi family and was an imperial fief (a marquisate from 1347 and a principate from 1709), with the right to mint coins.

It is home to a medieval rocca (fortress), turned into a palace, called the Rocca Meli Lupi. It has 16th century frescoes by Cesare Baglione, possibly Niccolò dell'Abbate, and others. The surrounding park was turned into an English garden around 1820.

Among its churches are:
Beata Vergine del Carmine e San Rocco
San Giacomo
Oratory of Sant'Antonio da Padova
Santa Caterina D'Alessandria

Twin towns
 Banská Štiavnica, Slovakia

References

Sources

External links
Website about the Rocca di Soragna 

 
Cities and towns in Emilia-Romagna